Tseten (d. 1676?) was a Choros-Oirat prince, and the eldest son of Erdeni Batur, the ruler of the Dzungar Khanate (now part of Western China) from 1634, until his death in 1653.

Fratricide
Tseten is best known for murdering his younger half-brother Sengge, who bypassed him in the line of succession to become the ruler of the Dzungar Khanate.

History of Kalmykia